WHHM-FM (107.7 MHz, "Star 107.7") is a radio station broadcasting an adult contemporary music format. Licensed to Henderson, Tennessee, United States, the station is owned by Thomas Radio, LLC.
In 2015, the station transitioned from an adult contemporary music format to a Hot AC music mix. As of January 2021, though, the station had returned to its former mainstream AC format.

References

External links

HHM-FM
Mainstream adult contemporary radio stations in the United States